Aït Aggouacha is a town and commune in Tizi Ouzou Province in northern Algeria. It is famed for its high quality kebabs.

References

Communes of Tizi Ouzou Province